Edgbastonia colmani is a species of small freshwater snails, aquatic gastropod mollusks in the family Tateidae. 

This species is endemic to Australia.

See also
 List of non-marine molluscs of Australia

References

Further reading

External links

 Ponder W., Zhang W.-H. (Wei-Hong), Hallan A. & Shea M. (2019). New taxa of Tateidae (Caenogastropoda, Truncatelloidea) from springs associated with the Great Artesian Basin and Einasleigh Uplands, Queensland, with the description of two related taxa from eastern coastal drainages. Zootaxa. 4583(1): 1-67

Tateidae
Gastropods of Australia
Endemic fauna of Australia
Critically endangered fauna of Australia
Gastropods described in 1990